Misia Candle Night 2016 was a concert tour by Japanese singer Misia and the fifth installment of the Misia Candle Night concert series. The two-date tour was held in collaboration with the World Heritage Theater project on September 10-11, 2016 at Kasuga-taisha in Nara, Nara to commemorate the Shinto shrine and World Heritage Site's 60th anniversary and the first Shikinen Zōtai (式年造替) ritual in 20 years.

Background
On June 6, 2016, Misia announced the two dates for the 2016 installment of the Misia Candle Night concert series. The concerts announced to be held on a special outdoor stage on the Tobihino (飛火野) hill of the Nara Park, where the Kasuga Shrine is located. On June 20, 2016, Michiko Shimizu was announced as a special guest for the two-date tour. Tickets went on sale to the general public on August 20, 2016. The charity Candle Night Bar, whose proceeds go toward the non-profit organization Mudef, raised funds of 441,401 yen for the two shows combined.

Set list
This set list is representative of the concert on September 11, 2016. It does not represent all concerts for the duration of the tour.

"Super Rainbow"
"Mayonaka no Hide-and-seek" ("Midnight Hide-and-seek")
"Anata ni Smile :)"
"Satchan"
"Hyakunen no Koe no Uta" ("Hundred Years of Voices in a Song")
"Watashi no Folk Medley" ("My Folk Medley")
"Ame no Machi o" ("In a Rainy Town") (Yumi Arai cover)
"Boku ga Ichiban Hoshikatta Mono" (Noriyuki Makihara cover)
"Machi" ("Town") (Tsuyoshi Domoto cover)
"Let It Smile"
"Indigo Waltz" (Toshinobu Kubota cover)
"Aitakute Ima"
"Orphans no Namida"
"One Day, One Life"
"Life in Harmony"
"Hatenaku Tsuzuku Story"
Encore
"Hitotsu Dake" ("Only One") (Akiko Yano cover)
"Candle of Life"

Shows

Personnel
Band
 Misia – lead vocals
 Tohru Shigemi – keyboard
 Shūhei Yamaguchi – guitar
 Jino – bass
 Tomo Kanno – drums
 Akio Suzuki - sax, flute
 Kumi Sasaki – backing vocals, organ
 Lyn - backing vocals

References

External links
 

2016 concert tours
Misia concert tours
Concert tours of Japan